Jeanne d'Arc Mujawamariya (born 13 March 1970, in Kigali) is a Rwandan politician, currently the Minister of Environment. She was formerly the Minister of Education (formally, the Minister of Education, Science, Technology and Research) in the government of Rwanda as well as the Rwandan Ambassador to Russia.

Political career
From 2003 to 2006, she served as Minister of State for Primary and Secondary Education in the Rwandan government and in 2005 she became the Minister of State in Charge of Higher Education in the same ministry. From 2006-March 2008, she was the Minister of Education. In January 2008, Mujawamariya appeared before a Rwandan parliamentary commission investigating the continued presence of "genocide ideology" in Rwandan schools.  Several MPs on the commission criticized Mujawamariya and Joseph Murekeraho, Minister of State for Primary and Secondary Education, for taking insufficient punitive action against teachers and curriculum developers who were disseminating anti-Tutsi sentiments in schools.
In March 2008, Mujawamariya went on to become the Minister in the Prime Minister's Office in charge of Gender and Family Promotion, a post she occupied until March 2011 when she became the Vice Chancellor/Rector of the prestigious Kigali Institute of Science and Technology-Rwanda. Mujawamariya was at the helm of the institute until 1 March 2013, when she was appointed by the President of Rwanda as ambassador to Russia. In November 2019, she became the Minister of the Environment.

Personal life and education
Mujawamariya earned a Bachelor of Science from Peoples' Friendship University of Russia and in 1997 received an Master of Science in chemistry from the same university.  She went on to earn a Ph.D. in chemistry and physics at Indian Institute of Technology Roorkee in 2001.  She is married and has three children with her husband. She is fluent in the English, French and Russian.

References

External links 

Welcome from the Minister, official website of the Rwandan Ministry of Education

Education ministers of Rwanda
Environment ministers of Rwanda
Family ministers of Rwanda
Research ministers of Rwanda
Science ministers of Rwanda
Living people
1970 births
Peoples' Friendship University of Russia alumni
Moscow State University alumni
Ambassadors of Rwanda to Russia
Women government ministers of Rwanda
Women ambassadors
21st-century diplomats
21st-century Rwandan women politicians
21st-century Rwandan politicians